Claire Slater (born 4 February 1984) is an English actress.

Education 
She attended Hertfordshire schools St. Francis' College in Letchworth Garden City and The Knights Templar School in Baldock. In 2005 Slater completed a three-year Musical Theatre Diploma course at Laine Theatre Arts in Epsom.

Career 
Slater started her acting career in 1990 with an appearance in the thriller The Laughter of God (called Married to Murder in the USA) which starred Peter Firth and Amanda Donohoe. In 1992 she also appeared in the TV film An Ungentlemanly Act, which starred Ian Richardson and Rosemary Leach.

Other TV appearances include roles in The Children of the New Forest, the series Is Harry on the Boat? (2002) and the series Helen West (2002), but she is probably best known for playing Martha Cratchit in the 1999 version of A Christmas Carol, in which she appeared with Patrick Stewart, Joel Grey and Richard E. Grant.

More recently, Slater appeared in ITV's series Heartbeat (2006), and as Laura Goggin in an episode of Doctors (2013).

Filmography

Television

References

External links

1984 births
Living people
People educated at St. Francis' College, Letchworth
People educated at The Knights Templar School, Baldock
British television actresses
English television actresses